Disc One: All Their Greatest Hits (1991–2001) is a greatest hits compilation album by Barenaked Ladies which spans their first decade as a band. It contains released singles, plus new songs "It's Only Me (The Wizard of Magicland)" and "Thanks That Was Fun", the latter which was released as a single. Disc One was released in November 2001 to a warm commercial reaction and was certified gold in the United States. The title itself is a tongue-in-cheek reference to a line from the "Box Set" off the album Gordon, which is about a box set release from a has-been band: "Disc One – it's where we've begun/It's all my greatest hits/And if you are a fan then you know that you've already got 'em." The album was released two months after the September 11 attacks, and is dedicated to the victims. The album was among the top 50 best-selling albums of 2001 in Canada and the fourth best-selling album of the year in Canada by a Canadian artist.

Content
The album compiles singles from the band's catalogue to that point, including two that had not been previously released on an album: "Lovers in a Dangerous Time" (a cover of the Bruce Cockburn song from a 1991 Cockburn tribute album) and "Get in Line" (from the 1999 King of the Hill soundtrack). Several other singles have edits and alternate versions. Some had been previously released (such as the "Shoe Box" radio remix), while others had new mixes created. Initially the band was uncertain if they should include minor hits "Be My Yoko Ono" and "Alternative Girlfriend". They held a poll on their website and the result was a nearly 50/50 split. As a result, the band decided to include both songs, resulting in the album running over 73 minutes long. Though the radio mix of "The Old Apartment" was used, the instrumental introduction was eliminated. Similarly, a new edit of "Pinch Me" was created using the radio edit's cropped intro, but leaving in the album version's guitar solo outro.

The album was touted as completely remastered, but as is the modern practice due to the loudness war (not employed to the same extent in the early 1990s), all the tracks were mastered at a very high volume level, noticeably higher than any of the original recordings, resulting in increased compression and some clipping.

Two other tracks were recorded for this album, but omitted from the finished record: "I Don't Get It Anymore" and "I Can, I Will, I Do" (held for the Shallow Hal soundtrack, but cut from it; re-recorded for Everything to Everyone, but cut from that album; re-recorded again for Barenaked Ladies Are Men). These recordings of "I Don't Get It Anymore" and "I Can, I Will, I Do" were later released on the rarity album, Stop Us If You've Heard This One Before in 2012.

Song releases
In line with the album's retrospective contents, the video for the single "Thanks That Was Fun" was a montage of all of the band's prior music videos (with singer's mouths altered to appear to be singing the new song).  Because of this, former keyboardist Andy Creeggan can be glimpsed in the video.  The band wanted to name the single "One Weaker", as a followup to the hit single "One Week", but management refused to allow it.

The album's other original song, "It's Only Me (The Wizard of Magicland)" was included on the soundtrack for the EA Sports video game NHL 2002, along with tracks from several other Canadian artists. In addition, the band members' names and faces were included in the game, and can be accessed by creating custom players with their names.

During the band's Fall/Winter 2001 Greatest Hits Tour, both "Thanks That Was Fun" and "It's Only Me (The Wizard of Magicland)" were performed under the guise of a "new greatest hit", poking fun at the industry practice oxymoron of including several new songs as part of a greatest hits package.

Track listing

Personnel
Barenaked Ladies
 Steven Page – lead  (1, 3, 5, 6, 7, 9–12, 15, 16, 17, 18; co-lead on "One Week," "If I Had $1,000,000," and "Lovers in a Dangerous Time") and background vocals, acoustic  (3, 6, 11, 12, 16) and electric  (1, 11, 15) guitars, liner notes annotations
 Ed Robertson – background  (1, 3, 5, 6, 7, 10, 11, 12, 15, 16, 17, 18) and lead  (2, 14, 19; co-lead on "One Week," "If I Had $1,000,000," and "Lovers in a Dangerous Time") vocals, electric  (1, 2, 4, 6, 7, 9–12, 14, 15, 17, 18, 19) and acoustic  (all except 1, 6, 7, 10, 13, 15 and 17) guitars, handclaps  (17)
 Jim Creeggan – double bass  (1, 3, 5, 8–11, 13, 15, 16, 18, 19), double electric bass  (4), electric bass  (2, 6, 7), handclaps  (17), viola and violin  (on "Pinch Me"), background vocals  (2, 3, 5, 6, 8, 11, 12, 15, 17, 18)
 Tyler Stewart – drums, handclaps  (on "Too Little Too Late"), tambourine  (on "Shoe Box" and "Too Little Too Late"), background vocals  (on "It's All Been Done")
 Kevin Hearn – clavinet  (17), electric guitar  (4), electric piano  (14), handclaps  (17), keyboards  (11, 14), organ  (14, 17), piano  (2, 3, 9, 16), sampler  (17), background vocals  (2, 7, 11, 17)
 Andy Creeggan – acoustic piano  (8), congas  (5), electric piano  (6), hammered dulcimer  (12), organ  (6), tambourine  (5, 6, 12), background vocals  (5, 6, 8, 12, 18)

Production
 Barenaked Ladies – producers  (1, 4, 5, 9, 11, 13, 15)
 Ben Mink – producer  ("Alternative Girlfriend", "Jane") 
 David Leonard and Susan Rogers – producers  (4, 9, 11)
 Don Was – producer  (2, 14, 17)
 Michael Phillip Wojewoda – producer  (1, 3, 8, 15, 16, 18)
 David Kahne – producer and drum programming on "Get in Line"
 Jim Scott – producer and engineer on "It's Only Me" and "Thanks That Was Fun"
 Aubrey Windfield, Dan Durbin – producers on "Lovers in a Dangerous Time"
 Ben Grosse – remix ("The Old Apartment")
 Tom Lord-Alge – remix ("It's All Been Done")
 Richard Sebree – photography
 John Rummen – design
 Kevin Hearn – illustrations
 Howie Klein, Larry LeBlanc – liner notes

Charts

Weekly charts

Year-end charts

References

2001 greatest hits albums
Barenaked Ladies albums
Albums produced by Don Was
Reprise Records compilation albums
Albums produced by Michael Phillip Wojewoda